H. Ty Warner (born September 3, 1944) is an American billionaire toy manufacturer, businessman, and former actor. He is the CEO, sole owner and founder of Ty Inc. which manufactures and distributes stuffed toys, including Beanie Babies and other lines. He is also the owner of Four Seasons Hotel New York, which he bought with profits earned selling Beanie Babies during a fad in the late 1990s. In 2020, he was No. 359 on the Forbes 400 list of the richest people in America, with a net worth of US$2.3 billion.

Biography

Early life and career
Warner was born on September 3, 1944, in Chicago, Illinois, and grew up in suburban La Grange, in a Prairie-style house designed in the early 1890s by Frank Lloyd Wright, now known as the Peter Goan House. His father was Harold "Hal" Warner, a jeweler and toy salesman. His mother was Georgia Warner, a pianist. He has a much younger sister, Joyce. He was named after baseball player Ty Cobb.

At the age of 14, Warner went to Lyons Township High School (north campus) in La Grange, Illinois.  He then went to St. John's Military Academy in Delafield, Wisconsin and graduated in 1962. Warner attended Kalamazoo College in Michigan but dropped out after a year.

Warner's relationships with both parents were strained. Georgia was noted for erratic and sometimes abusive or dangerous behavior and was diagnosed with paranoid schizophrenia in the 1970s. When Ty was an adult and his parents divorced, he was said to have attempted to seduce several of his father's girlfriends out of jealousy or competitiveness.

1980–1993
Warner moved to Los Angeles to start a career in acting. He had little success as an actor and returned to Chicago after five years. There he began working for plush toy maker Dakin as a salesman, the same company where his father worked. He was described by a former co-worker as possessing "uncanny" instincts as a salesman to retail shops, knowing which items would be most successful. In 1980, he was fired by Dakin, reportedly for selling his own products to established customers in competition with the company's line. After spending a three-year sabbatical in Italy, Warner returned to Chicago.

In 1986, he mortgaged his home and invested his life savings and a bequest from his father into founding Ty Inc. Warner started out selling stuffed toy cats (inspired by some plush he had seen in Italy).

1993–2004
In 1993, Ty Inc. launched Beanie Babies, a series of small plush toys shaped like various animals. He focused on selling the $5 or $10 Beanie Babies to small independent toy stores rather than large retailers like Toys R Us, Target, or Walmart, preferring to have multiple small clients rather than a handful of large ones. He drove up demand by artificially restricting items shipped to each store below requested orders, and by creating deliberate shortages by discontinuing old items and introducing new ones in an essentially arbitrary manner rather than the more common toy industry pattern of releasing new items once or twice a year. A secondary market developed when collectors began reselling the toys at greatly inflated prices, and various books, magazines, and accessories like carrying cases devoted to Beanie Babies appeared.  At the peak of the Beanie craze circa 1999, the privately owned Ty Inc. is believed to have earned over $700 million in profits in a year. The Beanie Babies phenomenon, coupled with the rise of the Internet, is cited as elevating Warner to billionaire status with a net worth of over $2.5 billion.

Pioneering Internet sales
Lina Trivedi was a college student when she worked at Ty Inc. and she approached Warner to talk about a new development that existed on college campuses called the Internet.  She indicated that the Internet was primarily a research tool, however, college students were starting to make personal websites and she thought creating a website for Beanie Babies could present an unprecedented opportunity to engage the market uniquely.  She brought to Ty's office a 14.4k modem and demonstrated how the Internet works.  Mr. Warner was intrigued and gave Trivedi a free license to create a website using her judgment and skills.  By the time the first iteration of the Ty website was published in late 1995, only 1.4% of Americans were using the Internet. The population of people using the Internet grew exponentially in the following years, along with the popularity of Beanie Babies.

2004–present
In 2007, Ty Inc. went head to head with MGA Entertainment, the makers of the Bratz dolls, with the release of the Ty Girlz dolls and virtual world.

He also has significant investments in hotels, property and golf courses. Ty Warner Hotels and Resorts include the Four Seasons Hotel in New York City; the Sandpiper Golf Course in Santa Barbara, California; the Four Seasons Resort and San Ysidro Ranch in Montecito, California; the Four Seasons Resort The Biltmore in Santa Barbara, California, purchased in 2000; the Kona Village resort in Hawaii, purchased in July 2004; the Montecito Country Club; and the Las Ventanas al Paraiso Resort in Los Cabos, Mexico, purchased in September 2004. In 2005, Warner also bought the beachfront Miramar resort and Rancho San Marcos golf course but sold the Miramar hotel in 2007 to Caruso Affiliated.

Philanthropy
He has donated in excess of $6 million to the Andre Agassi Foundation for underprivileged children in Las Vegas and $3 million for the creation of Ty Warner Park in Westmont, Illinois. He also donated $1.5 million for the creation of the Ty Warner Sea Center in Santa Barbara, California and donated one million Beanie Babies for children in Iraq. Warner also donated more than $300 million worth of soft toys for a Red Cross blood drive. Additionally, Warner has designed a number of Beanie Babies with the intention of donating all of the profits to charity. Ty Inc.'s charity releases have raised millions for a variety of charities, including the Elizabeth Glaser Pediatric AIDS Foundation, the American Red Cross, and the Princess Diana Memorial Fund.

In 2006, he received the Children's Champion Award from Children's Hunger Fund for his philanthropic efforts—Ty Inc. donated 1 million Beanie Babies to Children's Hunger Fund relief efforts in Iraq and Afghanistan.

In 2012, Warner stopped a woman and asked for directions in Santa Barbara, California. The woman was trying to raise money for a stem-cell procedure she needed to save her life. After learning of her condition, he gave her $20,000 for the procedure.

Tax evasion
In 2014, Warner was sentenced to two years of probation plus community service for tax evasion. Since 1996, he had maintained a secret offshore account in Switzerland with UBS, which according to the prosecution concealed at one time $107 million. Later, Warner used Zurcher Kantonalbank to maintain his offshore account. His philanthropic activities were considered when sentencing him and he paid a $53 million fine.

Warner had tried to take advantage of the IRS tax amnesty that was offered in the wake of the UBS 2008–10 tax scandal, but the government refused to accept him. His lawyers, including former IRS Deputy Commissioner Mark M. Matthews who is now a Member of Caplin & Drysdale, successfully used the "Olenicoff Defense" to convince the judge that Warner did not deserve the year-and-one-day prison sentence recommended by prosecutors. The defense was based on the government's treatment of Igor Olenicoff, a California real estate tycoon. The lawyers cited Olenicoff for getting off without a jail sentence when he was sentenced for tax evasion via offshore accounts.

Warner's pre-sentencing report that called for a jail sentence said his offshore account was the biggest ever found. In fact, the lawyers pointed out, Olenicoff had $240 million stashed offshore. The Olenicoff defense worked. On January 14, 2014, District Court Judge Charles P. Kocoras sentenced Warner to two years' probation and 500 hours of community service. The judge rejected the prosecution's recommendation for jail time of one year and one day, to serve as a deterrent to other tax cheats. Olenicoff, who also got two years' probation and community service, pleaded guilty to filing a false tax return—a felony. Warner pleaded guilty to the more serious charge of tax evasion.

Personal life
Two of Warner's long-term girlfriends (Patricia Roche and Faith McGowan) were closely involved in the operations of Ty, Inc. during the development and success of Beanie Babies. However, he never married and has no children. Warner maintains a low public profile, rarely granting media interviews or releasing personal or company information.

See also
 The World's Billionaires

References

External links
 Ty, Inc. website

1944 births
Living people
American billionaires
American people convicted of tax crimes
Philanthropists from Illinois
Beanie Babies
Businesspeople from Chicago
Businesspeople from Los Angeles
Toy inventors